"Making Plans for Nigel" is a song by English rock band XTC, released as the lead single from their 1979 album, Drums and Wires, by Virgin Records. It was written by Colin Moulding, the band's bassist. The lyrics are told from the point of view of parents who are certain that their son Nigel is "happy in his world", affirming that his future in British Steel "is as good as sealed", and that he "likes to speak and loves to be spoken to."

The single marked XTC's commercial breakthrough. It spent 11 weeks on the UK Singles Chart and peaked at #17. In 2016, the song was ranked number 143 on the Pitchfork website's list of the 200 best songs of the 1970s. It was also ranked number 73 in NME list of 100 best songs of the 70s.

Inspiration
Bassist Colin Moulding said of the song:

During this time, XTC typically rehearsed about two or three times a week, at which juncture Moulding would introduce his bandmates to whatever new songs he had been working on. He remembered that "Making Plans for Nigel" appeared to receive "a favourable response. But at that time, I didn't really have enough confidence in myself to know where I was going with the arrangement. The other guys helped me on that, I suppose."

Recording

In the XTC biography Chalkhills and Children, it is stated that the song's drum pattern was discovered by accident after a miscommunication between guitarist Andy Partridge and drummer Terry Chambers. Partridge said that the drum pattern was actually a deliberate attempt to invert drum tones and accents in the style of Devo's cover of the Rolling Stones' "Satisfaction". He explained that Moulding introduced the song to the rest of the band on a nylon-string guitar at a slow tempo and did not have an idea of how the arrangement should be fleshed out, "so we said [to Colin], 'Do you fancy trying something like [Devo] for this?" And Colin said, 'Yeah, give it a go.'"

In Chambers' recollection: "Because of the subject matter, I wanted to make the beat a bit more industrial. So instead of keeping the rhythm on the hi-hat, I played it on the floor tom and used the hi-hat for the accents. It was the opposite to what drummers usually do but it gave it a juddering, production-line feel. We used a keyboard to make a smashing sound, like an anvil in a foundry. Partridge said that once the drum pattern was established, the band decided that Moulding should duplicate the tom rhythm on his bass guitar. He continued:

Among the idiosyncrasies of the song's arrangement is Partridge's high backing vocals. He commented:

Virgin Records immediately earmarked "Making Plans for Nigel" as the lead single off XTC's Drums and Wires, although the band did not expect that the single would be successful. Partridge later complained about the amount of time spent recording the song, remarking that "[w]e spent a week doing Nigel and three weeks doing the rest of the album."

Packaging
The first 20,000 pressings of the single came in a fold-out cover that created a fully playable gameboard of "Chutes and Ladders" adapted to details of Nigel’s "miserable life", including the purchase of a scooter, job interviews, a holiday in Spain and an engagement to "a very nice girl." There were two versions of the gameboard, one to be played by Nigel and the other to be played by his parents. As credited on the back cover, the illustrator was Steve Shotter and sleeve design was by Cooke Key.

Music video
The video, directed by Russell Mulcahy, was shot in London on 10 July 1979, together with another put together very quickly for "Life Begins at the Hop."

Release
"Making Plans for Nigel" was released in August 1979 as the opening track to Drums and Wires. On 14 September, the song was issued as a single, backed with Partridge's "Bushman President" and "Pulsing Pulsing". According to Dave Gregory: 

The single spent 11 weeks on the UK Singles Chart and marked the band's first hit record. Biographer Chris Twomey wrote that although the single is reported to have reached number 17, it was "later learned that a computer error by the chart compilers had forced the record downwards when it had in fact gone up." The song also reached number 12 on the Canadian chart and remained on the charts there for 22 weeks.

After the song's release, 100,000 steel workers went on strike and contacted Moulding for a statement on their issues, but he offered no comment. British Steel also gathered four Sheffield employees named Nigel to talk about job satisfaction for the trade publication Steel News. In a 2020 Guardian article about the song, Moulding said: "I've had countless Nigels come up to me over the years and say: 'That song is my life.'"

Personnel
As provided on the record sleeve:

XTC
Andy Partridge – lead guitar, backing vocals
Colin Moulding – lead vocals, bass guitar
Dave Gregory – rhythm guitar, backing vocals
Terry Chambers – drums, percussion

Technical
Steve Lillywhite – production
Hugh Padgham – engineering

Cover versions 

 1992 – Primus, Miscellaneous Debris
 1993 – Burning Heads, Burning Heads
 1995 – The Rembrandts, A Testimonial Dinner: The Songs of XTC
 1997 - Robbie Williams, B-side to Old Before I Die
 1998 – Pitchshifter, Genius (JS Clayden slightly alters the lyrics, singing "He has no future in a British steel [...] Nigel's no future is as good as sealed")
 2001 – Al Kooper, Rare & Well Done
 2004 – Nouvelle Vague, Nouvelle Vague
 2010 – The Bad Shepherds, By Hook or By Crook

Charts

References

External links
 "Making Plans for Nigel" on Chalkhills

1979 songs
XTC songs
Songs written by Colin Moulding
Song recordings produced by Steve Lillywhite
Songs about parenthood